Sabrina Hering (born 16 February 1992) is a German canoeist. She competed in the women's K-4 500 metres event at the 2016 Summer Olympics where the team won a silver medal. She qualified for the 2020 Summer Olympics, in the Women's K-4 500 metres.

Career 
In 2008, she was European Junior Champion in the K-2 500 meters, and in 2009 she was Junior World Champion in the K-2 500 meters. She competed in 2014 European Championships in Brandenburg an der Havel, where she won bronze in the K-2 1000 meters, together with Steffi Kriegerstein. At the 2014 World Championships in Moscow, she finished fifth in the K-2 500 meters, and sixth place in the K-4 200 meters. A year later, she won the 2015 World Championships in Milan together with Steffi Kriegerstein in the K-2 1000 meters, and K-2 200 meters, winning the bronze medal.

She competed at the 2016 European Championships in Moscow, in K-2 500 meters, taking second place, behind Gabriella Szabó and Danuta Kozák. In the 2016 Summer Olympics in the K-4 500 meters together with Tina Dietze, Steffi Kriegerstein and Franziska Weber, she won a silver medal. She was awarded the Silver Laurel Leaf, on 1 November 2016.

At the 2017 World Championships in Račice u Štětí, she won silver in the K-4 500 meters. Sabrina Hering also competed in the K-1 500 meters and finished fourth.

References

External links

 

1992 births
Living people
German female canoeists
Olympic canoeists of Germany
Canoeists at the 2016 Summer Olympics
Canoeists at the 2020 Summer Olympics
Place of birth missing (living people)
Medalists at the 2016 Summer Olympics
Olympic silver medalists for Germany
Olympic medalists in canoeing
ICF Canoe Sprint World Championships medalists in kayak
European Games competitors for Germany
Canoeists at the 2019 European Games
21st-century German women